IPSC Suriname is the Surinamese association for practical shooting under the International Practical Shooting Confederation.

External links 
 Official homepage of IPSC Suriname

References 

Regions of the International Practical Shooting Confederation
Sports organisations of Suriname